Brian Nelson (born 29 September 1946 in Holbeach, Lincolnshire, UK) is a professor emeritus of French Studies at Monash University, Melbourne.

Nelson graduated with an undergraduate degree from Cambridge University and did postgraduate work at Oxford University where he obtained his D.Phil. in 1979. Before going to Monash he taught one year in Paris (1970–71) and several years at the University of Wales Aberystwyth (1973–86). In 1986, he became professor at Monash and retired in 2008. Nelson taught modern French literature and cultural history, and literary translation.

In addition to a number of monographs including Zola and the Bourgeoisie and Émile Zola: A Selective Analytical Bibliography, he has made a number of modern translations of Émile Zola for the Oxford World's Classics series. Speaking about his translation of The Belly of Paris, Nelson said:
My aim as a translator is to transform Zola's prose into a work of art that approaches the original, that is, is faithful to the spirit of the original. This means capturing the structure and rhythms, the tone and texture, and the lexical choices --in sum, the particular idiom-- of Zola's novel, as well as preserving the "feel" of the social context out of which the novel emerged and which it represents.

Nelson was formerly the editor of the Australian Journal of French Studies (2002-2020), co-founded the journal Romance Studies, edited the monograph series Monash Romance Studies, and is a former President of AALITRA (the Australian Association for Literary Translation).

Works
Author
Zola and the Bourgeoisie: A Study of Themes and Techniques in Les Rougon-Macquart (1982)
Émile Zola: A Selective Analytical Bibliography (1982)
The Cambridge Introduction to French Literature (2015)
Emile Zola: A Very Short Introduction (2020)

Editor
Naturalism in the European novel: New Critical Perspectives (1992)
Telling Performances: Essays on gender, narrative and performance (2001)
Practising Theory: Pierre Bourdieu and the Field of Cultural Production (2004)
After Blanchot: Literature, Philosophy, Criticism (2005)
The Cambridge Companion to Zola (2007)
Perspectives on Literature and Translation: Creation, Circulation, Reception (2013)

Translator
Emile Zola, The Ladies' Paradise (Oxford, 1995)
Emile Zola, Pot Luck (Oxford, 1999)
Emile Zola, The Kill (Oxford, 2004)
Emile Zola, The Belly of Paris (Oxford, 2007)
Emile Zola, The Fortune of the Rougons (Oxford, 2012)
Emile Zola, Earth (Oxford, 2016)
Emile Zola, His Excellency Eugène Rougon (Oxford, 2018)
Emile Zola, The Assommoir (Oxford, 2021)
Marcel Proust, Swann in Love (Oxford, 2017)

Awards and honours
 Jebb Studentship (University of Cambridge) (1969–71)
 Chevalier dans l’Ordre des Palmes Académiques (2003)
 Runner-up, International Federation of Translators “Aurora Borealis” Prize for Outstanding Translation of Fiction (2011)
 Elected Fellow of the Australian Academy of the Humanities (2011)
Winner of the Translation Prize, New South Wales Premier's Literary Awards (2015)

Notes

External links
"Book Interview: Translator Brian Nelson on Finally Hearing Émile Zola’s Voice in English",  artsfuse.org, May 2021

Alumni of the University of Cambridge
Alumni of the University of Oxford
Living people
Australian translators
Academic staff of Monash University
People from Holbeach
1946 births
Translators of Émile Zola